Scopula clarivialis  is a moth of the  family Geometridae. It is found on western Sumatra.

References

Moths described in 1931
clarivialis
Moths of Indonesia